Kaštel Kambelovac is a town within the administrative area of Kaštela in Dalmatia, Croatia.

The town of Kaštela
The town of Kaštela is located on the coast of the Bay of Kaštela. It has over 40 000 inhabitants, and it is the second largest town in the Split and Dalmatia County and occupies a 17 kilometer shoreline. Although legally considered a single town (grad), Kaštela is traditionally divided between seven distinguished settlements all of which are centered on either a fort or castle:
Kaštel Sućurac
Kaštel Gomilica
Kaštel Kambelovac
Kaštel Lukšić
Kaštel Stari
Kaštel Novi
Kaštel Štafilić

History
Kaštel Kambelovac was built by the aristocratic family Cambi from Split (1589). In 1517 noblemen and landowners from Split, brothers Jerolim and Nikola Cambi, built a castle on an islet to protect themselves and residents of Lažan and Kruševik settlements. The castle was cylindrically shaped (only one in Kaštela) and very suitable for defense. The citadel was surrounded by the sea but was later connected with the mainland by filling up and levelling.

References

External links
 http://kastela.croatian-adriatic.eu/

Populated places in Split-Dalmatia County